Aplos Software is a privately held company that specializes in software as a service for nonprofit organizations. Their primary focus is simple software to manage the essential nonprofit tasks of fund accounting, nonprofit tax preparation and donor management for small, mid-sized, and large non-profit organizations.

History 

Aplos Software was founded in 2009 in Fresno, California by Dan Kelly and Tim Goetz, a certified public accountant. Tim Goetz previously served as an executive pastor of a church and helped found two nonprofits. He couldn't find the low-cost fund accounting solution he wanted for his nonprofits, so he joined with a Fresno-based investor that shared his vision to serve the nonprofit sector with simple, affordable software and founded Aplos Software.
 After initially developing a desktop fund accounting software program, in 2011 Aplos Software launched its fund accounting software, Aplos Accounting, as an online product, also known as software as a service, tailored specifically to small and mid-sized non-profit organizations and religious corporations. 
 The company raised over $3.4 million in funding through an angel investor to expand the development of its web-based nonprofit software suite, $2 million of which was raised in 2014. 
 Aplos launched an integration with Church Community Builder, a church management platform in January 2016.
 In February 2016, Aplos raised $4 million in additional funding through a private venture capital fund. 
 In June 2017, Aplos announced a merger with Portalbuzz, a membership management platform that specializes in software and website portals for service clubs.
 Aplos and Gusto (software), a payroll and HR platform, launched an integrated solution for payroll and reimbursements to be tracked within the accounting of nonprofits and churches.

Key Areas of Development 
Aplos Software focused its software on simplifying the primary back office tasks required to manage a nonprofit, private foundation, foundation (nonprofit), charitable organization or church.

Fund Accounting
Nonprofit fund accounting differs from business accounting because it is often necessary to track restricted and unrestricted funds separately. This often occurs when a donor or grant specifies that the organization must use the funds for a specific purpose. The accounting software must track how these funds were used and how much is available. Aplos first launched its online fund accounting software, Aplos Accounting, in 2011. The most popular competitive accounting product for small and mid-sized nonprofits is Quickbooks

In October 2012, Aplos Software launched Aplos Oversight, an online software which provides an administrator or accountant real-time access to the accounting of multiple organizations.

Form 990 Preparation
In summer of 2012, Aplos Software was approved as an IRS efile provider to submit IRS tax forms on behalf of tax-exempt organizations and in October 2012 launched Aplos e-File, a tax preparation and filing software for IRS Form 990-N. IRS Form 990-N is an annual electronic IRS filing for tax-exempt organizations with less than $50,000 in annual gross receipts.  In 2013, Aplos added tax preparation and e-file software for IRS Form 990-EZ and its required schedules to Aplos e-File. IRS Form 990-EZ is the short form of the full Form 990 IRS tax forms and is available to organizations with up to $200,000 in gross receipts and $500,000 in assets.

Donor Management
Aplos Software also focused on expanding the fundraising and donation tracking aspects of its software since 2012 to make it more successful for the vertical market of nonprofits. It launched a contributions management module in 2012 that tracked donations within Aplos Accounting and created contribution statements, which are annual giving receipts required by the IRS. In July 2013 it began offering a donor management module, and in May 2017 it expanded on its module to launch a stand-alone product as Aplos Donor Management.

According to the Chronicle of Philanthropy, nonprofits are increasingly creating initiatives to accept donations online and growth in online giving outpaced traditional methods in 2012. To keep pace with the growing popularity and requests by its customers for an online giving platform, Aplos Software expanded its fundraising functionality in January 2014 by partnering with WePay, an online payment portal, to add the ability for nonprofits to accept online donations.

See also 
 Comparison of accounting software
 Fund accounting
 Non-profit organization
 Alternative giving
 Software as a service
 IRS Form 990

References

External links 
www.aplos.com

Non-profit technology
Cloud applications